The Chenogne massacre was a war crime committed by members of the 11th Armored Division, an American combat unit, near Chenogne, Belgium, on January 1, 1945, during the Battle of the Bulge.

According to eyewitness accounts, an estimated 80 German prisoners of war were massacred by their American captors; the prisoners were assembled in a field and shot with machine guns. It was one of several war crimes committed during the Battle of the Bulge by members of both Allied and Axis forces.

The events were covered up at the time, and none of the perpetrators were ever punished. Postwar historians believe the killings were carried out on verbal orders by senior commanders that "no prisoners were to be taken".

Background 
On December 17, 1944, during the Battle of the Bulge, soldiers from the Waffen-SS gunned down 84 American prisoners at the Baugnez crossroads near the town of Malmedy. When news of the killings spread among American forces, it aroused great anger among frontline troops. One American unit issued orders that "no SS troops or paratroopers will be taken prisoner but will be shot on sight."

At Chenogne, the prisoners of war killed were members of the Führerbegleitbrigade and 3rd Panzergrenadier Division.

Eyewitness
S/Sgt. John W. Fague of B Company, 21st Armored Infantry Battalion (of the 11th Armored Division), in action near Chenogne, describes the killing of German prisoners by American troops:

Fague also pointed out he had no knowledge of the Malmedy massacre at that time.

Cover-up 

The official postwar history published by the United States government states that while "It is probable that Germans who attempted to surrender in the days immediately after the 17th ran a greater risk" of being killed than earlier in the year, "there is no evidence... that American troops took advantage of orders, implicit or explicit, to kill their SS prisoners." However, according to George Henry Bennett, "The caveat is a little disingenuous", and he notes that it is likely orders given by the U.S. 328th Infantry Regiment to shoot prisoners were carried out, and that other US regiments were likely given similar orders. But the killing of SS prisoners had become routine at the time for some units. The 90th Infantry Division at the Saar "executed Waffen-SS prisoners in such a systematic manner late in December 1944 that headquarters had to issue express orders to take Waffen-SS soldiers alive so as to be able to obtain information from them".

In July 2018, KQED-FM radio aired an episode of the Reveal series called "Take No Prisoners: Inside a WWII American War Crime", in which Chris Harland-Dunaway investigated the Chenogne massacre. According to his sources, US soldiers shot about 80 German soldiers after they had surrendered (roughly one for each American killed in the Malmedy massacre). Harland-Dunaway refers to General George S. Patton's diary in which the latter confirms that the Americans "...also murdered 50 odd German med [sic]. I hope we can conceal this".

According to a declassified file Harland-Dunaway got access to, a soldier named Max Cohen described seeing roughly 70 German prisoners machine-gunned by the 11th Armored Division in Chenogne. Supreme Commander of the Allied Expeditionary Force General Dwight D. Eisenhower demanded a full investigation, but the 11th Armored were uncooperative, saying "it's too late; the war is over, the units are disbanded." Eisenhower never obtained an investigation of Chenogne. American lawyer Ben Ferencz, who served as a prosecutor at the Nuremberg Tribunal, said after acquainting himself with the declassified report that "It smells to me like a cover-up, of course."

See also
List of massacres in Belgium

References 

1945 in Belgium
Massacres in 1945
World War II prisoner of war massacres by the United States
January 1945 events in Europe
Mass murder in 1945